The Ambassador of Ireland to the United States is the head of the Embassy of Ireland, Washington, DC, and the official representative of the Government of Ireland to the Government of the United States.

Daniel Mulhall, appointed Ambassador in August 2017, was incumbent .

The Irish Embassy is located at 2234 Massachusetts Avenue, NW in Sheridan Circle since 1949 and the Ambassador’s residence is at 2244 S Street NW.

Ambassadors
2022 - date: Geraldine Byrne Nason
2017 - 2022: Daniel Mulhall
2013 - 2017: Anne Anderson
2007 - 2013: Michael Collins
2002 - 2007: Noel Fahey
1997 - 2002: Sean O Huiginn
1991 - 1997: Dermot Gallagher
1985 - 1991: Padraic N. MacKernan
1984 - 1985: Tadhg O'Sullivan
1978 - 1984: Sean Donlon
1973 - 1978: John G. Molloy
1970 - 1973: William Warnock
1964 - 1969: William P. Fay
1960 - 1964: Thomas J. Kiernan
1950 - 1960: John Joseph Hearne
1947 - 1950: Sean Nunan
1938 - 1947: Robert Brennan
1929 - 1938: Michael MacWhite
1924 - 1929: Timothy Smiddy

References 

United States
Ireland